Yelysei Pletenetskyi, or Yelysei Pletenetsky (1550 – 29 October 1624), also known as Elizeusz Pletenecki, was a Ukrainian archimandrite. He served as archimandrite of a monastery in the Pinsk region from 1595 to 1599, and of Kyiv Pechersk Lavra from 1599 until his death. During the latter tenure he worked hard at reforming the monastery, and secured the right of stauropegion for it. He established a hospital for the poor, a printing house, and the Radomysl paper mill.

References

1550 births
1624 deaths
Archimandrites
16th-century Eastern Orthodox clergy
17th-century Eastern Orthodox clergy